Margaret Audley may refer to:
Margaret Audley (FitzWarin) (died 1373), wife of  Fulk VIII FitzWarin, 4th Baron FitzWarin (1341–1374).
Margaret Audley (Howard) (1540–1564), wife of Thomas Howard, 4th Duke of Norfolk